Surgone is a locality in Humboldt County, California.

References

Former settlements in Humboldt County, California